George Jeffrey (15 August 1916 – 1979) was a Scottish professional footballer who played for Wishaw Juniors, Tottenham Hotspur, Motherwell and Dumbarton.

Football career 
Jeffrey played for Wishaw Juniors before joining Tottenham Hotspur in 1937.  The inside left scored one goal in one appearance for the 'Spurs', in a 3-2 victory over Plymouth Argyle at White Hart Lane in October 1937 in the old Second Division. 

After leaving White Hart Lane, Jeffrey went on to play for Motherwell and later Dumbarton.

References 

1916 births
1979 deaths
Footballers from Motherwell
Scottish footballers
English Football League players
Tottenham Hotspur F.C. players
Motherwell F.C. players
Aberdeen F.C. wartime guest players
Dumbarton F.C. players
Association football inside forwards